6- and 12-String Guitar is the second album by Leo Kottke, a solo instrumental steel-string acoustic guitar album originally released by John Fahey's Takoma Records in 1969. It is popularly known as the Armadillo album after the animal illustrated in the distinctive cover art (by Annie Elliott). Although Kottke has had a prolific career as a recording artist, 6- and 12-String Guitar remains his best-known album.

History
The album showcases Kottke's early, hard-driving polyphonic finger-picking style (which eventually led to his developing tendinitis and having to change his playing approach).  Even at the fastest tempos the notes are clean and crisp, with a distinctive tone. The album was recorded in one afternoon, in exactly the running order of the album.  Most tracks were done in a single take.  Kottke doesn't even pause when (audibly) smacks the slide on the guitar neck on "The Sailor's Grave on the Prairie." In the liner notes to Anthology he states, "We didn't know about sequencing, so the record is in the order it was recorded...The record took three-and-a-half hours to do, and all I had to do was sit down and play everything I ever knew."

True to its title, the album contains performances on both 6- and 12-string acoustic guitars, some using a slide. Although Kottke has included vocals in other albums, this album is all instrumental – the reason being, as Kottke explains in the liner notes, his voice "sounds like geese farts on a muggy day."

All the tracks were written by Kottke except Jesu, Joy of Man's Desiring, Kottke's arrangement of the familiar Bach piece.

The album had a large influence on, and was an inspiration for, guitarist Michael Hedges, who would later tour with Kottke.

This album has been re-released as an SACD.

Reception

Writing for Allmusic, music critic Richie Unterberger wrote of the album "Kottke's brand of virtuosity, however, is more soothing and easy on the ear than Fahey's. It's far from sappy, though, the rich and resonant picking intimating some underlying restlessness, like peaceful open fields after a storm. Establishing much of the territory Kottke was to explore throughout his career, this release was also one of his most popular, eventually selling over 500,000 copies." Rolling Stone brought the album to a wider public with its review in 1970 by Carl Bauer, in which he wrote: "With all the shit that has been released recently, it was a distinct pleasure to come across this album... Kottke isn't a new addition to the Page-Beck school of grating, hypertensive guitarists, as if you were expecting that. He's an acoustic guitarist from Minneapolis whose music can invoke your most subliminal reflections or transmit you to the highest reaches of joy... anything in addition to his guitar would be superfluous."

Track listing (with Kottke's notes)

Side One

Side Two

Personnel
 Leo Kottke – 6- & 12-string guitars

Cover design by Annie Elliott (who also did the cover for 12-String Blues)

References

External links
 Read some contemporary and retrospective reviews of 6 & 12-String Guitar
 Leo Kottke's official site
 Unofficial Leo Kottke web site (fan site)

1969 albums
Leo Kottke albums
Takoma Records albums